Pax Ludens is a non-profit organization specialized in training and research on international conflict and crisis management. The mission of the organization is to help future decision makers tackle complex international political dynamics and excel in conflict management. The core activities are described as the design and execution of seminars and simulation exercises based on real and current case studies in the field of International Relations and conflict resolution. The programs offered challenge participants to explore various international political conflict scenarios and deal with crisis and conflict situations as events unfold.

Key partners
 The Clingendael institute
 The Hague Centre for Strategic Studies
 The Turkish Ministry of Foreign affairs
 Delft Technical University
 The Netherlands Ministry of Defence staff training college
 The University of Amsterdam
 Webster University Leiden and London
 University College Utrecht
 The University of Monterrey, Mexico
 Vrede van Utrecht

Simulations as learning tools
The world of International Relations is demanding more in-depth knowledge about how and why international dynamics unfold in the way they do. The world today is more complex than ever before, the relationships governing inter-and intrastate (conflict) management have led many to appreciate the multi-disciplinary character of International Relations. The challenge for teaching institutions is evident: what is the most adequate methods to stimulate effective learning processes? To connect disciplines in a new and meaningful way.

Scenarios
Some example of the scenarios used are:
 Greater Middle East
 Caucasus
 Israeli-Palestinian conflict
 Good governance in Africa
 UN Security Council

Publications
 Mans and Shimshon. Knowledge creation and transfer in the military. Journal of International Negotiations. Publication forthcoming 2010.
 Mans, Shimshon, Suransky and Hilst. Baby-sitting or bird watching? The Role of Supervision in IR Simulation Exercises. In Organizing and Learning through Gaming and Simulation Igor Mayer & Hanneke Mastik (eds.) 2008.
 Mans, Shimshon, Suransky and Hilst. How to InterACT in conflict settings - The Role of Supervision in IR Simulation Exercises. In: Igor Mayer & Hanneke Mastik (eds.) 2007, Organizing and Learning through Gaming and Simulation, Proceedings of Isaga 2007, Eburon, Delft
 Mans and Shimshon. International Conflict Management “Analysis & Intervention” Training Manual. Clingendael Institute & Pax Ludens. 2005.
 Suransky, Leonard (1983) “International Relations Games and Simulations.” In The Guide to Simulations/Games for Education and Training, edited by Robert Horn and Anne Cleaves. Beverly Hills, CA: Sage.
 Suransky, Leonard. (1980) The Play of Consciousness and Educational Praxis – a Phenomenology of Learning with the Middle East Conflict Simulation Game. USA: University of Michigan Ann Arbour

See also
 Leonard Suransky

References

External links
 https://web.archive.org/web/20100402231112/http://www.paxludens.org/
 http://www.clingendael.nl
 http://www.hcss.nl

Non-profit organisations based in the Netherlands
Organisations based in The Hague